Saint Rhian was a Welsh abbot. He is a virtually unknown saint other than his feast day, which is March 8th.  The town name of Llanrhian, Pembrokeshire, commemorates him  and its church is dedicated to St Rhian.

He is the patron saint of Lovers, beekeepers, epilepsy, fainting, and the plague.

References

Welsh Roman Catholic saints
Welsh abbots